This is a list of all episodes of the western television series The Deputy.

Series overview

Episodes
 (s) = Story
 (t) = Teleplay

Season 1 (1959–60)

Season 2 (1960–61)

External links
 

Lists of American drama television series episodes